Wayne Milera (born 14 September 1997) is a professional Australian rules football player who plays for the Adelaide Football Club in the Australian Football League (AFL). He was drafted by Adelaide with pick 11 in the 2015 national draft.

Pre-AFL career
He also played all six games for South Australia at the Under 18 National Championships. Milera was part of 's Indigenous AFL Academy. During the year he was diagnosed with Wolff–Parkinson–White syndrome after completing ECG and cardiac tests with the South Australian Under-18 program and underwent heart surgery. Just a week later he kicked 3 goals in a semi-final to help Centrals to a thrilling win.

AFL career
Milera debuted in round 1, 2016 against  at Etihad Stadium. After playing in the opening four rounds of his debut season Milera suffered an injury and missed the next three rounds. He returned in round eight against  and then in round nine against , Milera kicked three goals.

After the round 10, 2017 match against , in which Milera recorded sixteen disposals, four tackles and three goals, he was the round nominee for the AFL Rising Star.

In the 2018 season, Milera was moved to the half-back line as a replacement for the injured Brodie Smith in Adelaide's round 6 victory over the Gold Coast Suns Milera collected a career-high 33 disposals.

Statistics
 Statistics are correct to end of Round 2 2020

|- style="background:#eaeaea;"
! scope="row" style="text-align:center" | 2016
| style="text-align:center" | 
| 30 || 8 || 5 || 6 || 49 || 40 || 89 || 25 || 17 || 0.6 || 0.8 || 6.1 || 5.0 || 11.1 || 3.1 || 2.1
|- style="background:#eaeaea;"
! scope="row" style="text-align:center" | 2017
| style="text-align:center" | 
| 30 || 16 || 8 || 3 || 141 || 108 || 249 || 53 || 36 || 0.5 || 0.2 || 8.8 || 6.8 || 15.6 || 3.3 || 2.3
|- style="background:#eaeaea;"
! scope="row" style="text-align:center" | 2018
| style="text-align:center" | 
| 30 || 19 || 2 || 2 || 231 || 137 || 368 || 89 || 49 || 0.1 || 0.1 || 12.1 || 7.2 || 19.3 || 4.6 || 2.5
|- style="background:#eaeaea;"
! scope="row" style="text-align:center" | 2019
| style="text-align:center" | 
| 30 || 17 || 6 || 7 || 184 || 125 || 309 || 93 || 52 || 0.3 || 0.4 || 10.8 || 7.3 || 18.1 || 5.4 || 3.0
|- style="background:#eaeaea;"
! scope="row" style="text-align:center" | 2020
| style="text-align:center" | 
| 30 || 2 || 0 || 0 || 17 || 13 || 30 || 7 || 2 || 0.0 || 0.0 || 8.5 || 6.5 || 15.0 || 3.5 || 1.0
|- style="background:#eaeaea;"
! scope="row" style="text-align:center" | 2021
| style="text-align:center" | 
| 30 || 0 || 0 || 0 || 0 || 0 || 0 || 0 || 0 || 0.0 || 0.0 || 0.0 || 0.0 || 0.0 || 0.0 || 0.0
|- class="sortbottom"
! colspan=3| Career
! 62
! 21
! 18
! 622
! 423
! 1045
! 267
! 156
! 0.3
! 0.2
! 10.0
! 6.8
! 16.8
! 4.3
! 2.5
|}

References

External links

Living people
1997 births
Central District Football Club players
Adelaide Football Club players
Indigenous Australian players of Australian rules football
Australian rules footballers from South Australia